Rhea is a given name and surname.

It was originally the name of Rhea, a Titan in Greek mythology.

Notable people with this name

Given name
 Rhea Anastas (born 1969), American art historian
 Rhea Bailey (born 1983), English actress
 Rhea Belgrave (born 1991), Trinidadian footballer
 Rhea Boyd, American paediatrician
 Rhea Carmi (born 1942), Israeli artist
 Rhea Chakraborty (born 1992), Indian actress
 Rhea Chiles (1930–2015), First Lady of the State of Florida
 Rhea Clyman (1904-1981), Canadian journalist
 Rhea Dimaculangan (born 1991), Filipino volleyball player
 Rhea Durham (born 1978), American model
 Rhea Fairbairn (1890–1953), Canadian tennis player
 Rhea Galanaki (born 1947), Greek author
 Rhea Lydia Graham (born 1952), American researcher
 Rhea Haines (1894–1964), American actress
 Rhea Harder (born 1976), German actress
 Rhea Kapoor (born 1987), Indian producer
 Rhea Kohan, American writer
 Rhea Litré (born 1984), American singer
 Rhea Mitchell (1890–1957), American actress and screenwriter 
 Rhea Moss-Christian (born 1974), Marshallese alumni
 Rhea Perlman (born 1948), American actress
 Rhea Pillai (born 1965), Indian model
 Rhea Raj (born 2000), Indian-American singer
 Rhea Ripley (born 1996), Australian professional wrestler
 Rhea Santos (born 1979), Filipino broadcaster 
 Rhea Seehorn (born 1972), American actress
 Margaret Rhea Seddon (born 1947), American astronaut
 Rhea Sharma (born 1995), Indian television actress
 Rhea G. Sikes (1922-2019), American television producer
 Rhea Silberta (1900-1959), Yiddish composer
 Rhea Mazumdar Singhal (born 1980), Indian entrepreneur
 Rhea Suh (born 1970), American alumni
 Rhea May Taleb (born 2001), Lebanese footballer
 Rhea Tregebov (born 1953), Canadian poet, novelist, and writer
 Rhea Woltman (1928-2021), American pilot

Surname
 Arnt O. Rhea (1852-1937), American politician
 Caroline Rhea (born 1964), stand-up comedian, television actress and host
 Hortense Rhéa (1844–1899), French actress
 James Rhea (1791–1812), American soldier
 John Rhea (1753–1832), United States Congressman
 John Stockdale Rhea (1855–1924), U.S. Congressman from Kentucky
 Karen Rhea, American mathematics educator
 La Julia Rhea (1908–92), American opera singer
 Lady Rhea, a Wiccan high priestess
 Russ Rhea (born 1962) American journalist
 Slater Rhea, American singer-songwriter; TV performer
 Timothy Rhea (born 1967), American conductor, and Director of Bands at Texas A&M University
 William Francis Rhea (1858–1931), U.S. Congressman from Virginia

Mythological characters
 Rhea (mythology), a Titan in Greek mythology
 Rhea Silvia, in Roman mythology the mother of the twins Romulus and Remus
 Rhea (mother of Aventinus), mother of Aventinus by Hercules
 Rhea or Riadh, Celtic mythological hero

Fictional characters
 Rhea of the Cöos, a character in Stephen King's Dark Tower novels
 Rhea Jones, a DC comics character
 Rhea (Supergirl), a character in the TV series Supergirl
 Rhea, a character in Fire Emblem: Three Houses

See also 
Rhea (disambiguation)

Given names derived from birds